In digital typography, the Medieval Unicode Font Initiative (MUFI) is a project which aims to coordinate the encoding and display of special characters in medieval texts written in the Latin alphabet, which are not encoded as part of Unicode.

Organization 

MUFI was founded in July 2001 by a workgroup consisting of Odd Einar Haugen (Bergen), Alec McAllister (Leeds), and Tarrin Wills (Sydney). From 2006 to 2015, MUFI had a board of four members, consisting of the three founding members and Andreas Stötzner (Leipzig). Currently the board consists of Tarrin Wills, Copenhagen (Chair), Alex Speed Kjeldsen, Copenhagen (Deputy chair), Odd Einar Haugen, Bergen and Beeke Stegmann, Iceland.

Character variants 
In medieval texts, many special ligatures, scribal abbreviations, and letter forms existed, which are no longer a part of the Latin alphabet. As few of these characters are encoded in Unicode, ligatures have to be broken up into separate letters when digitized. Since few fonts support medieval ligatures or alternative letter forms, it is difficult to transmit them reliably in digital formats.

To prevent the possibility of corruption of the source texts, the eventual goal of the MUFI is to create a consensus on which characters to encode, and then present a completed proposal to the Unicode Consortium. In the meantime, a part of the Private Use Area has been assigned for encoding, so these characters can be placed in typefaces for testing and to speed up the later transition to the final encodings (if the project is accepted). This was originally based upon work done by the TITUS project, which also deals with Greek, Cyrillic, Georgian, Arabic and Devanagari characters, As of Unicode 5.1, this proposal has been made, covering 152 characters, and most of these (89 in all) have been encoded in the Latin Extended-D block. Others are in the Combining Diacritical Marks Supplement (26 chars.), Latin Extended Additional (10 chars.), Supplemental Punctuation (15 chars.) and Ancient Symbols (12 chars.).

Fonts 
, Junicode (GPL) is the first typeface to cover all of MUFI 4.0, also in its italic face. Prior to MUFI 4.0, there were some 39 code point conflicts with Junicode.

The Kurinto Font Folio has two typefaces – Kurinto Book UFI and Kurinto Roma UFI – that cover all of MUFI , including code points added after version 4.0 of MUFI. Kurinto also includes the code points of the CYFI and RUFI standards.

There are three typefaces that are confirmed to cover all of MUFI 3.0. These are Cardo, Andron Scriptor Web and Palemonas MUFI. Only the last one comes in four faces (regular, italic, bold and both).

LeedsUni supports all of MUFI 2.0. Caudex, which is available at Google Fonts for embedding, claims to support most of MUFI 3.0, but is not listed on the MUFI homepage.
Alphabetum has an almost complete coverage of MUFI 2.0 and some coverage of version 3.0, in addition to a complete coverage of MUFI 1.0. 

TITUS Cyberbit covers all of MUFI 1.0 and includes some additional characters at different places, as it predates the MUFI project.

There is a project to make available MUFI characters, including version 4.0 ones, in LaTeX.

Private Use Area 

The MUFI set includes standardized characters from many areas in the Basic Multilingual Plane and includes named character references ("entities") for use in SGML and XML, especially in TEI formats such as Menota. It also specifies many characters that are not encoded in Unicode, yet, in the Private Use Area which is designated for such use. When MUFI PUA characters have been accepted for encoding they are removed from the PUA in subsequent versions. As of version 4.0 there are the following PUA assignments, organized into several sub-areas.

Coordination 
Similar initiatives have been founded for Early Cyrillic Symbols (Cyrillic Font Initiative, CYFI) and others. They are coordinated in the Linguistic Corporate Use Area (LINCUA). UNZ is a set compatible with MUFI, but it is not a true subset since it contains PUA additions of its own. It is intended for blackletter fonts, their typographic ligatures in particular.

See also 
 ConScript Unicode Registry
 Record type, a historic family of typefaces designed to allow the special characters of medieval manuscripts to be replicated in print
 Unicode fonts

External links 

MUFI character database
Medieval Nordic Text Archive (extensive use of MUFI characters)

References 

Unicode
Palaeography
Medieval studies
Digital typography